The Oshan Z6 is a 5-seater mid-size crossover SUV produced by Changan Automobile under the Oshan brand. Launched in mid-2022, Chang'an initially sold the Oshan Z6 only in China and UAE.

Overview

The Oshan Z6 debuted in March 2022 and went on sale in the Chinese market in mid-2022. The Oshan Z6 was branded under Oshan, Chang'an's affordable premium brand, a sub-brand that focuses on building passenger vehicles.

Interior and technology
The interior of the Oshan Z6 has three screens. The first is a 10.25 inch instrument panel with 3D technology. The second is a 12.3 inch central touch screen with an uneven shape. The third screen is 9.1 inches in diameter and is mainly used for navigation. The three screen setup is standard across the range and for higher trim levels, AR-HUD is added. The infotainment system is paired with the OnStyle 5.0 system with microphone-free karaoke and voice recognition, allowing drivers to link their voices to different adjustments. The Oshan Z6 also has the EaglePilot 7.0 driver-assistance system with 12 radars, 3 millimeter-wave radars, and 5 cameras. The system allows the vehicle to park itself and assist the driver on road.

Powertrain
The Oshan Z6 is available as two petrol and an additional PHEV version. All powertrains are mated to a 7-speed dual-clutch transmission.

References

External links
Official website 

Oshan Z6
Crossover sport utility vehicles
Cars of China
Cars introduced in 2022